The  is an electric multiple unit (EMU) train type operated by the Tokyo subway operator Tokyo Metropolitan Bureau of Transportation (Toei) on the Toei Shinjuku Line in Tokyo, Japan, since 2005.

Overview
Based on the JR East E231 series design, the type consists of 10-300 series 8- and 10-car sets together with 10-300R series 8-car sets formed of refurbished 10-000 series intermediate cars sandwiched between newly built 10-300 series driving cars. 3rd-batch trainsets based on the JR East E233-2000 series design were introduced from September 2013.

Operations

Formations
, the fleet consists of eight eight-car 10-300 series sets (10-370 to 10-440), and 15 ten-car 10-300 series sets (10-450 to 10-620), all based at Oshima Depot.

10-300R series

The four eight-car 10-300R series sets (10-310 to 10-360) were formed as shown below with six motored (M) cars and two trailer (T) cars, and car 1 at the Shinjuku end.

 "xx" corresponds to the set number.
 Cars 3 and 7 were each fitted with two lozenge-type pantographs, and car 5 had one.

10-300 series 8-car sets

The eight 8-car 10-300 series sets (10-370 to 10-440) are formed as shown below with five motored (M) cars and three trailer (T) cars, and car 1 at the Shinjuku end.

 "xx" corresponds to the set number.
 Cars 3 and 7 are each fitted with two single-arm pantographs, and car 5 has one.

10-300 series 10-car sets
The four 10-car 10-300 series sets (10-450 to 10-480) are formed as shown below with six motored (M) cars and four trailer (T) cars, and car 1 at the Shinjuku end.

 "xx" corresponds to the set number.
 Cars 3, 5, and 9 are each fitted with two T-PT7154-A single-arm pantographs.

3rd-batch 10-300 series 10-car sets

The 3rd-batch 10-300 series sets (10-490 to 10-510) delivered from 2013 are formed as shown below with six motored (M) cars and four trailer (T) cars.

 "xx" corresponds to the set number.
 Cars 3, 7, and 9 are each fitted with two T-PT7154-A single-arm pantographs.

4th-batch 10-300 series 10-car sets
Three fourth-batch 10-car sets were introduced from May 2015. These sets differ from earlier built sets by the addition of a light green stripe running alongside the bodies, including on the doors. The fourth-batch sets (10-520 onward) are formed as shown below with six motored (M) cars and four trailer (T) cars.

 "xx" corresponds to the set number.
 Cars 3, 7, and 9 are each fitted with two single-arm pantographs.

Interior

1st/2nd batch sets
Passenger accommodation consists of longitudinal bench seating with individually sculpted seats covered with green moquette. Passenger information is provided by LED scrolling displays above the doorways.

3rd-batch sets

4th-batch sets
Three fourth-batch sets have two LCD passenger information screens above each doorway.

History
Twelve eight-car 10-300 series sets (96 vehicles) were built between 2004 and 2006 to replace the older (1st and 2nd batch) 10-000 series sets dating from the late 1970s. These were designed to be lengthened to ten-car sets in the future with the insertion of additional motored and trailer cars as cars 3 and 4. The majority of the sets were built by Tokyu Car Corporation (now J-TREC) in Yokohama, but the intermediate cars of the three sets 10-450 to 10-470 were built at JR East's Niitsu factory in Niigata Prefecture, and these were transferred to Tokyu Car's Yokohama factory in two batches in January and February 2006 to be incorporated into the completed sets. The first set, 10-370, was delivered in November 2004 for night-time testing of the new D-ATC signalling system. The first sets entered revenue service on 21 May 2005.

The six eight-car 10-300R series sets were created in 2005 and 2006 by adding new 10-300 series driving cars built by Tokyu Car sandwiching three pairs of refurbished 10-xx7 and 10-xx8 cars from former 10-000 series sets 10-010 to 10-180. 

The newly formed ten-car sets (10-450 to 10-480) entered revenue service from 1 June 2010. Lengthening from eight to ten cars involved inserting new 2nd-batch "10-4x3" (T1) trailer cars and "10-4x5" (M1) motored cars, and renumbering the original "10-4x5" cars to "10-4x4" as well as removing the original pantograph.

A further three new ten-car 3rd-batch sets were delivered during 2013. The first, set 10-490, entered revenue service on 15 September 2013. These sets are based on the JR East E233 series design.

The last remaining 10-300R series set in service, set 10-330, was withdrawn following its final run on 14 February 2017.

It was announced by Toei that eight new ten-car sets would enter service from 28 November 2021; Toei also announced that some of the eight-car sets would be lengthened to ten-car sets by the end of 2022.

Build histories

The build histories of the 10-300 series sets are as follows.

References

External links

 Toei 10-300 series (Japan Railfan Magazine) 

Electric multiple units of Japan
Toei Subway
Train-related introductions in 2005
Tokyu Car multiple units
J-TREC multiple units
1500 V DC multiple units of Japan